't Hart is a Dutch surname. Dutch het hart means "the heart", but in the past also "the deer" as well as "the village green". People with this name include:

 (born 1944), Dutch writer, poet and literary critic
Lenie 't Hart (born 1941), Dutch animal caretaker and animal rights activist
Maarten 't Hart (born 1944), Dutch writer and biologist

References

Dutch-language surnames